SS George E. Waldo was a Liberty ship built in the United States during World War II. She was named after George E. Waldo,  a US Representative from New York.

Construction
George E. Waldo was laid down on 18 September 1944, under a Maritime Commission (MARCOM) contract, MC hull 2501, by the St. Johns River Shipbuilding Company, Jacksonville, Florida; she was sponsored by Mrs. Ruby M. Waggener, the mother of the southern states winner of a newspaper contest for news boys selling war bonds and stamps, and was launched on 23 October 1944.

History
She was allocated to the Shepard Steamship Corp., on 31 October 1944 for use during World War II. She was sold for commercial use, 4 September 1946, to Matson Navigation Co., for $577,464.50 and renamed the SS Hawaiian Forester In 1955 she was sold to the Weyerhaeuser Steamship Company and renamed the SS C. R. Musser.
In 1969 she was sold to Reliance Carriers SA and renamed the SS Reliance Serenity. In 1970 she was sold to Luzon Stevedoring Corp. of Manila - Philippines and renamed the SS Lsco Bulktrain. In 1974 she was scrapped in Taiwan.

References

Bibliography

 
 
 
 

 

Liberty ships
Ships built in Jacksonville, Florida
1944 ships